Wat Prang Luang is an ancient Thai Buddhist temple in Nonthaburi province, it can be considered as the oldest monastery and archaeological site in Nonthaburi and Bangkok Metropolitan Region. It is situated along Khlong Om Non, also known as Khlong Bangkok Noi.

The temple previously called "Wat Luang" (วัดหลวง, "royal temple")  presumably built in reign of the King Ramathibodi I (U-Thong) the first monarch and founder Ayutthaya Kingdom more than 650 years ago. Believing that its location used to be his residence after the cholera evacuation before the establishment of Ayutthaya Kingdom.

Later in the Rattanakosin period,  Vajirananavarorasa, the 10th Supreme Patriarch of Thailand, found that prang (chedi in Khmer-style) was built at the same time was the temple. Then he change name of the temple to "Wat Prang Luang" which has an ancient prang as both landmark and symbol.

The prang is old and dilapidated in present, it has been archaeological proven to date back to the early Ayutthaya period with a different structure than the other prang of the same period. A principal Buddha image in Māravijaya attitude has 9 meters (29 ft) width lap named "Luang Pho U-Thong" is enshrined in the ordination hall. It is considered a sacred Buddha image and is highly revered by Buddhists, both local and outsiders. Every monday evening, the abbot holds a prayer activity on a weekly basis.

References

External links
Wat Prang Luang

Ancient monuments in Thailand
14th-century Buddhist temples
Buddhist temples in Nonthaburi Province
Religious buildings and structures completed in 1361